Notre-Dame de Paris (Latvian: Parīzes Dievmātes katedrāle) is a Latvian operatic melodrama by Zigmars Liepiņš.

The opera was first performed on 7 April 1997. Liepiņš was awarded the Latvian Great Music award for the work in 1997.

References

 

Operas
1997 operas
Melodramas
Works based on The Hunchback of Notre-Dame
Latvian-language operas
Operas based on works by Victor Hugo